Sophie Wade is a businessperson, founder and Workforce Innovation Specialist of consulting firm Flexcel Networks. She is the author of the book Embracing Progress: Next steps for the Future of work and a speaker on Future-of-Work issues. She serves on the Presidents’ Assembly Steering Committee of the National Association of Women Business Owners (NAWBO) after serving as the President of the New York City chapter of NAWBO 2015-17.

Early life and career
Wade was born and grew up in London, England. Wade has a B.A. degree from Oxford University in Oriental Studies (Chinese) and an MBA degree from INSEAD business school in France. She lived and worked in London, Hong Kong, France, Germany, Europe and U.S.A.  In her career, she has worked at or consulted with large corporations as well as startups in strategy and finance roles assisting entrepreneurs and major corporations to build teams and ventures and create partnerships. In 2011, she founded Flexcel Network initially to advocate for and expand the implementation of workplace flexibility. She is a writer and speaker on the Future of Work, talent management, employer branding, career transitioning and portfolio careers, as well as flexible working.

Books
 
In her book, she described approaches for workforce development. Approaches described by her include adapting new technologies, engagement through culture and mindset, good leadership, transparency, and empathy, coaching for productivity, performance, and creativity, focusing on values, cultural impact, and environmental issues, treating freelancers and contractors as employees.

Personal life
Wade currently lives in Manhattan, New York. She is divorced with two children Liam and Gigi.

References

External links 
 Sophie Wade on HuffPost
 Sophie wade on Fortune Magazine

Living people
HuffPost writers and columnists
Year of birth missing (living people)
Alumni of the University of Oxford
INSEAD alumni